The Tel Aviv Open was not held in 1982.

Aaron Krickstein won the tournament, beating Christoph Zipf in the final, 7–6, 6–3.

At 16 years and 2 months old, Krickstein became the youngest winner of an ATP title in the Open Era.  This record still stands as of 2022.

Seeds

Draw

Finals

Top half

Bottom half

References

 Main Draw

Tel Aviv Open
1983 Grand Prix (tennis)